The 2004–05 North Carolina Tar Heels men's basketball team represented University of North Carolina. The head coach was Roy Williams. The team played its home games at the Dean Smith Center in Chapel Hill, North Carolina, and was a member of the Atlantic Coast Conference.

Roster

Schedule

|-
!colspan=9 style="background:#56A0D3; color:#FFFFFF;"| Exhibition

|-
!colspan=9 style="background:#56A0D3; color:#FFFFFF;"| Regular Season

|-
!colspan=9 style="background:#56A0D3; color:#FFFFFF;"| ACC tournament

|-
!colspan=9 style="background:#56A0D3; color:#FFFFFF;"| NCAA tournament

Tar Heel Times

NCAA basketball tournament
West
North Carolina 96, Oakland 68
North Carolina 92, Iowa State 65
North Carolina 67, Villanova 66
North Carolina 88, Wisconsin 82
Final Four
North Carolina 87, Michigan State 71
North Carolina 75, Illinois 70

Awards and honors
 Sean May, NCAA Men's MOP Award
Raymond Felton, Bob Cousy Award

Team players drafted into the NBA

References

NCAA Division I men's basketball tournament championship seasons
NCAA Division I men's basketball tournament Final Four seasons
North Carolina
North Carolina Tar Heels men's basketball seasons
North Carolina
Tar
Tar